Italy competed at the 1976 Summer Olympics in Montreal, Quebec, Canada. 210 competitors, 183 men and 27 women, took part in 122 events in 20 sports.

Medalists

Gold
 Klaus Dibiasi — Diving, Men's Platform 
 Fabio Dal Zotto — Fencing, Men's Foil Individual Competition

Silver
 Sara Simeoni — Athletics, Women's High Jump 
 Giuseppe Martinelli — Cycling, Men's Individual Road Race 
 Giorgio Cagnotto — Diving, Men's Springboard 
 Maria Consolata Collino — Fencing, Women's Foil Individual Competition
 Fabio Dal Zotto, Giambattista Coletti, Attilio Calatroni,  Stefano Simoncelli, and Carlo Montano — Fencing, Men's Foil Team Competition
 Mario Tullio Montano, Tommaso Montano, Angelo Arcidiacono, Michele Maffei, and Mario Aldo Montano — Fencing, Men's Sabre Team Competition
 Umberto Panerai, Roldano Simeoni, Riccardo De Magistris, Alessandro Ghibellini, Sante Marsili, Vincenzo D'Angelo, Marcello Del Duca, Gianni De Magistris, Alberto Alberani, Silvio Baracchini, and Luigi Castagnola — Water Polo, Men's Team Competition

Bronze
 Giancarlo Ferrari — Archery, Men's Individual Competition
 Felice Mariani — Judo, Men's Lightweight (63 kg) 
 Roberto Ferraris — Shooting, Men's Rapid-Fire Pistol 
 Ubaldesco Baldi — Shooting, Men's Trap Shooting

Archery

Competing for the second time in archery at the Olympics, Italy won its first medal (a bronze) in the sport.  The medal was won by Giancarlo Ferrari, one of two Italian men who had competed four years before.  Sante Spigarelli, the other, also improved his rank drastically in 1976.  For the first time, Italian women competed in Olympic archery, taking 12th and 19th place.

Women's Individual Competition
 Franca Capetta — 2339 points (→ 12th place)
 Ida Da Poian — 2282 points (→ 19th place)

Men's Individual Competition
 Giancarlo Ferrari — 2495 points (→  Bronze Medal)
 Sante Spigarelli — 2419 points (→ 10th place)

Athletics

Men's 800 metres
 Carlo Grippo
 Heat — 1:47.21
 Semi Final — 1:46.95
 Final — 1:48.39 (→ 8th place)

Men's 5.000 metres
 Venanzio Ortis
 Heat — 13:52.40 (→ did not advance)

Men's 4x100 metres Relay
Vincenzo Guerini, Luciano Caravani, Luigi Benedetti, and Pietro Mennea
 Heat — 39.35s 
 Semi Final — 39.39s 
 Final — 39.08s (→ 6th place)

Men's Marathon
 Francesco Fava — 2:14:24 (→ 8th place)
 Massimo Magnani — 2:16:56 (→ 13th place)
 Giuseppe Cindolo — did not finish (→ no ranking)

Men's High Jump
 Rodolfo Bergamo
 Qualification — 2.16m
 Final — 2.18m (→ 6th place)

 Riccardo Fortini
 Qualification — 2.05m (→ did not advance)

 Oscar Raise
 Qualification — 2.05m (→ did not advance)

Men's Long Jump 
 Roberto Veglia
 Heat — 7.48m (→ did not advance)

Men's Discus Throw
 Armando Devincentis
 Qualification — 62.26m 
 Final — 55.86m (→ 15th place)

 Silvano Simeon
 Qualification — 59.06m (→ did not advance)

Men's 20 km Race Walk
 Armando Zanbaldo — 1:28:25 (→ 6th place)
 Vittorio Visini — 1:29:31 (→ 8th place)
 Roberto Buccione — 1:30:40 (→ 10th place)

Basketball

Men's team competition
Preliminary round (group B):
 Lost to United States (86-106)
 Defeated Czechoslovakia (79-69) 
 Lost to Yugoslavia (87-88) 
 Defeated Puerto Rico (95-81) 
Classification Matches:
 5th/8th place: Defeated Australia (79-72)
 5th/6th place: Defeated Czechoslovakia (98-75) → Fifth place

Team roster
Giuseppe Brumatti
Giulio Jellini
Carlo Recalcati
Luciano Vendemini
Fabrizio Delia Fiori
Renzo Bariviera
Marino Zanatta
Dino Meneghin
Pier Luigi Marzorati
Luigi Serafini
Ivan Bisson
Gianni Bertolotti
Head coach: Primo Giancarlo

Boxing

Canoeing

Cycling

Fourteen cyclists represented Italy in 1976.

Individual road race
 Giuseppe Martinelli — 4:47:23 (→  Silver Medal) 
 Vittorio Algeri — 4:47:23 (→ 8th place) 
 Roberto Ceruti — 4:49:01 (→ 26th place) 
 Carmelo Barone — 4:49:01 (→ 31st place)

Team time trial
 Carmelo Barone
 Vito Da Ros
 Gino Lori
 Dino Porrini

Sprint
 Giorgio Rossi — eliminated in quarterfinals (→ 8th place)

1000m time trial
 Massimo Marino — 1:08.488 (→ 10th place)

Individual pursuit
 Orfeo Pizzoferrato — 5th place

Team pursuit
 Sandro Callari
 Cesare Cipollini
 Rino De Candido
 Giuseppe Saronni

Diving

Equestrian

Fencing

18 fencers, 13 men and 5 women, represented Italy in 1976.

Men's foil
 Fabio Dal Zotto
 Carlo Montano
 Stefano Simoncelli

Men's team foil
 Carlo Montano, Fabio Dal Zotto, Stefano Simoncelli, Giovanni Battista Coletti, Attilio Calatroni

Men's épée
 John Pezza
 Nicola Granieri
 Marcello Bertinetti

Men's team épée
 John Pezza, Nicola Granieri, Fabio Dal Zotto, Marcello Bertinetti, Giovanni Battista Coletti

Men's sabre
 Mario Aldo Montano
 Michele Maffei
 Angelo Arcidiacono

Men's team sabre
 Mario Aldo Montano, Mario Tullio Montano, Michele Maffei, Tommaso Montano, Angelo Arcidiacono

Women's foil
 Maria Consolata Collino
 Carola Mangiarotti
 Giulia Lorenzoni

Women's team foil
 Maria Consolata Collino, Giulia Lorenzoni, Doriana Pigliapoco, Susanna Batazzi, Carola Mangiarotti

Gymnastics

Judo

Modern pentathlon

Three male pentathletes represented Italy in 1976.

Individual
 Daniele Masala
 Pierpaolo Cristofori
 Mario Medda

Team
 Daniele Masala
 Pierpaolo Cristofori
 Mario Medda

Rowing

Sailing

Shooting

Swimming

Men's Competition
 Marcello Guarducci, Roberto Pangaro, Paolo Revelli, Enrico Bisso, Giorgio Lalle, Paolo Barelli, and Riccardo Urbani

Men's 4 × 200 m Freestyle Relay
Marcello Guarducci, Roberto Pangaro, Paolo Barelli, and Paolo Revelli
 Final — 7:43.39 (→ 8th place)

Men's 4 × 100 m Medley Relay
Enrico Bisso, Giorgio Lalle, Paolo Barelli, and Marcello Guarducci
 Final — 3:52.92 (→ 7th place)

Women's Competition
 Laura Bortolotti, Giuditta Pandini, Antonella Roncelli, Iris Corniani, Donatella Schiavon, and Elisabetta Dessy

Volleyball

Men's team competition
Preliminary round (group B)
 Lost to Soviet Union (0-3)
 Lost to Japan (0-3)
 Lost to Brazil (2-3)
Classification Matches
 5th/8th place: Lost to Czechoslovakia (0-3)
 7th/8th place: Lost to Brazil (0-3) → 8th place

Team roster
Andrea Nannini 
Paolo Montorsi 
Stefano Sibani 
Giorgio Goldoni 
Francesco Dall'Olio 
Fabrizio Nassi 
Rodolfo Giovenzana 
Andrea Nencini 
Mario Mattioli 
Giovanni Lanfranco 
Erasmo Salemme 
Marco Negri 
Head coach: Franco Anderlini

Water polo

Men's team competition
Team roster
Alberto Alberani
Roldano Simeoni
Silvio Baracchini
Sante Marsili
Marcello Del Duca
Gianni de Magistris
Alessandro Ghibellini
Luigi Castagnola
Riccardo de Magistris
Vincenzo D'Angelo
Umberto Panerai

Weightlifting

Wrestling

References

External links
Italy at the 1976 Montréal Summer Games
 

Nations at the 1976 Summer Olympics
1976 Summer Olympics
Olympics